EasyBeans is an open-source Enterprise JavaBeans (EJB) container hosted by the OW2 Consortium. The License used by EasyBeans is the LGPL. EasyBeans is the EJB 3.0 container of the  JOnAS application server.

EasyBeans is integrated in the JOnAS application server Java EE 5 certified application server.

EasyBeans main goal is to ease the development of Enterprise JavaBeans. It uses some new architecture design like the bytecode injection (with ASM ObjectWeb tool), IoC, POJO and can be embedded in OSGi bundles or other frameworks (Spring, Eclipse plugins, etc.).

It aims to provide an EJB 3.0 container as specified in the Java Platform Enterprise Edition (Java EE) in its fifth version. It means that Session beans (Stateless or Stateful), Message Driven Beans (MDB) are available on EasyBeans.

See also 
 JOnAS application server
 Hibernate
 OpenEJB

External links 
 The EasyBeans developer site
 The EasyBeans site
 JSR 220 (EJB 3.0)
 JSR 181 (Web Services Metadata for the Java Platform)

OW2
Java enterprise platform